Nicola van der Kaay (born 10 February 1996) is a New Zealand triathlete who represented her country at the 2018 Commonwealth Games on the Gold Coast. She won a bronze medal in the mixed relay with teammates Andrea Hewitt, Tayler Reid, and Ryan Sissons, and was the best-placed New Zealander in the women's triathlon, finishing seventh. She competed at the 2022 Commonwealth Games where she came 9th in the women's event. She grew up in Taupō.

References

1996 births
Living people
New Zealand female triathletes
Triathletes at the 2018 Commonwealth Games
Commonwealth Games bronze medallists for New Zealand
Commonwealth Games medallists in triathlon
Sportspeople from Rotorua
Olympic triathletes of New Zealand
Triathletes at the 2020 Summer Olympics
20th-century New Zealand women
21st-century New Zealand women
Triathletes at the 2022 Commonwealth Games
Medallists at the 2018 Commonwealth Games